Via Mala is a novel by the Swiss writer John Knittel, which was first published in 1934. After the disappearance of a tyrannical sawmill owner in a village in Switzerland, his family is widely suspected of having murdered him.

The title Via Mala refers to the Viamala, a historic route through the Rhine canyon in Switzerland. Literally, it means bad path. All main characters in the novel walk on a bad path, not only the miller Jonas Lauretz, but also his family, guilty or not, and even the judge. 

The criminal story is based on a case of murder reported from the Obermühle (Upper Mill) in Kirchensittenbach, Bavaria, in 1817.

Adaptations
The novel was turned into a film Via Mala directed by Josef von Báky during the Nazi era. The film had a troubled production and was released only a month before the end of the Nazi regime. The film was remade in 1961 and a television adaptation Via Mala was broadcast in 1985.

References

Bibliography
 O'Brien, Mary-Elizabeth. Nazi Cinema as Enchantment. The Politics of Entertainment in the Third Reich. Camden House, 2006.

1934 novels
Swiss novels adapted into films
Novels by John Knittel
Novels set in Switzerland